Ultra Blue (stylized as ULTRA BLUE) is the fourth Japanese studio album (sixth overall) by Hikaru Utada, released in 2006. It debuted at number one on the Oricon daily, weekly and monthly charts and sold 500,317 copies in its first six days of sales. Ultra Blue had sold more than one million copies worldwide and almost four million digital single tracks and ringtones as of July 13, 2006 according to EMI.

Ultra Blue was also a strong online digital seller. After two months of digital downloads, Ultra Blue remained in the top ten album downloads on Japan's largest online music store, iTunes Japan. This album also became the fourth most downloaded album on iTunes Japan of the year and won an "Album of the Year" title at the 2007 Nihon Golden Disk Awards. On July 30, 2007, EMI Group released its Annual Report for 2007, and in it reported that Utada's album Ultra Blue had sold 1.3 million units worldwide, making it EMI Music's 10th-best selling album of 2006. Despite its success in terms of promotions, Ultra Blue is Utada's least commercially successful Japanese album to date in terms of physical sales, until it was surpassed by Utada Hikaru Single Collection Vol. 2 in 2010. Utada went on a nationwide Japan tour called Utada United 2006 to support the album.

Promotion

Taiwanese promotion
This album is her most heavily promoted album in Taiwan since her compilation album, Utada Hikaru Single Collection Vol. 1. Pre-order receipts were made available 2 weeks before the Taiwanese pressing of Ultra Blue. Those who pre-ordered received a Japan imported Ultra Blue poster packaged in a transparent cylindrical tube. Commercials were aired often on buses, MRT stations, as well as local channels helping to promote the album, playing "Blue" in the background. One of its tag-line was, "The whole world is waiting, Utada Hikaru, Ultra Blue" (this is a direct translation). Also, Toshiba-EMI of Taiwan collaborated with Yam.com and created an Ultra Blue blog similar to Utada's Japanese blog. The website held an essay contest about "You and Utada Hikaru". Toshiba-EMI Taiwan also held a private premier listening press party by inviting an ambassador from the Japan branch of Toshiba-EMI to represent the absent Utada.  For what seems to be  the final wave of promotion, the company put together a short "Blue" music video to air in between show blocks on various channels. The video consisted of pictures of the Ultra Blue booklet, the commercial clip of Ultra Blue and also a scene from the "Colors" video. The album debuted and stayed at the #1 spot in the G-Music Combo album charts for three consecutive weeks, with its debut week accounting for 26.39% of the total album sales in Taiwan for that week, charting for a total of 15 weeks.

North America promotion
The album was Utada's heaviest Capitol Records-promoted album since her Cubic U album, Precious. After the physical CD was released in Japan on June 14, 2006, the album was made available on iTunes to Japan and other countries, including the United States and Canada, on June 28, 2006. It was also released on the UK edition of iTunes.

In Canada, the physical CDs for Ultra Blue and Utada Hikaru Single Collection Vol.1 were released on July 11, 2006. In the United States, the physical CDs for Ultra Blue and Utada Hikaru Single Collection Vol.1 were released on September 19, 2006.

The B-sides of "Colors" ("Simple and Clean") and "Passion" ("Sanctuary") were not included on this album, but in her English album This Is the One.

Track listing
All songs are written, composed and arranged by Hikaru Utada, except "Colors" (arranged by Hikaru Utada & Kei Kawano).

Singles

Personnel

Hikaru Utada – vocals, songwriting, production, keyboards, arranging , programming , acoustic piano , basic programming  
Yamada Masashi – featured vocals, chorus 
Teruzane Skingg Utada – production
Miyake Akira – production, executive producer
Doyama Shoji – executive producer
Kawano Kei – arranging, keyboards, programming 
Tomita Yuzuru – programming 
Alexis Smith – programming 
Matt Rohde – keyboards, programming , acoustic piano 
David Carpenter – bass 
Kon Tsuyoshi – acoustic guitar 
Tsunemi Kazuhide – synthesizer programming 
Great Eida Group – violin section 
Abe Masashi Group – cello section 
Takakuwa Hideyo – flute 
Brio Taliaferro – programming 
Forrest Robinson – drums 
Ben Mauro – guitar 
Glenn Erwin – pro-tools operation 
Goetz B. – mixing
Goh Hotoda – mixing , recording 
Matsui Atsushi – recording 
Daniel Burns – recording 
Pat Woodward – recording 
Komori Masahito – assistant engineering
Saito Yuta – assistant engineering
Yamamoto Yasutaka – assistant engineering
Nakauchi Taketoshi – assistant engineering
Dave Emery – assistant engineering
Flancesco Perlangeli – assistant engineering
Matt Snedecor – assistant engineering
Heath Aiken – assistant engineering
Kazuaki Kiriya – art direction and photography
Cho Kenji – art direction and design
Ogawa Kyohei – styling
Inagaki Ryoji – hair and make-up

Charts

Oricon sales chart (Japan)

Current total sales (worldwide): 1.3 million

Release history

References

Hikaru Utada albums
2006 albums
Japanese-language albums
Universal Music Japan albums